"Putting Holes in Happiness" is a song by American rock band Marilyn Manson. It was released as the second single from their sixth studio album Eat Me, Drink Me. Written on lead singer Marilyn Manson's birthday (January 5, 2007), the song was initially set as the first single from the album, but this was soon changed at the request of Manson's record label, Interscope, and "Heart-Shaped Glasses (When the Heart Guides the Hand)" was released instead as the album's first single (similar to the case of "Get Your Gunn" from the band's debut). A two-track promotional disc was released in June 2007, but no confirmation of the song as the album's second single followed until Marilyn Manson confirmed the next single to be "Putting Holes in Happiness" on August 7, 2007. The song has already appeared on the radio in France, where a promo of the single has been sent out to several major radio stations.

On August 23, 2007, the music video for "Putting Holes in Happiness", created by the famous French filmmaker Philippe Grandrieux, was released on Yahoo!. Manson has stated in various interviews that select segments of the video were filmed in Germany during the shooting of the "Heart-Shaped Glasses (When the Heart Guides the Hand)" video in April 2007.

The Guitar Hero Remix by Nick Zinner version of the single was featured on early special editions of Guitar Hero III: Legends of Rock.

Track listing
Promo single
"Putting Holes In Happiness" (Radio Edit) — 3:57
"Putting Holes In Happiness" (Album Version) — 4:31

Album single
"Putting Holes In Happiness" (Album Version) — 4:31
"Putting Holes In Happiness" (Boys Noize Remix) — 5:38
"Putting Holes In Happiness" (Guitar Hero Remix by Nick Zinner) — 3:44
"Putting Holes In Happiness" (Video) — 4:00

ITunes Germany E.P.
"Putting Holes In Happiness" (Album Version) — 4:31
"Putting Holes In Happiness" (Boys Noize Remix) — 5:38
"Putting Holes In Happiness" (Guitar Hero Remix by Nick Zinner) — 3:44
"You And Me And The Devil Makes 3" (Remix by Adam Freeland) — 5:39

German Maxi CD

"Putting Holes in Happiness" (Radio Edit)
"Putting Holes in Happiness (Boyz Noise Remix)"
"Putting Holes in Happiness" (Guitar Hero Remix by Nick Zinner)
"Putting Holes in Happiness" (Video)

Remixes
"Putting Holes In Happiness" (Boys Noize Remix)
"Putting Holes In Happiness" (Ginger Fish Remix)
"Putting Holes In Happiness" (Nick Zinner Remix – Guitar Hero III: Legends of Rock)
"Putting Holes In Happiness" (Robots to Mars Remix)
"Putting Holes In Happiness" (DJ Eric Ill & Scott Orlans Mix)

Charts

References

2000s ballads
2007 singles
Marilyn Manson (band) songs
2007 songs
Songs written by Marilyn Manson
Songs written by Tim Sköld
Interscope Records singles
Gothic rock songs
Rock ballads